Vérandas Willems–Crelan was a UCI Professional Continental team founded in 2013 and based in Belgium. During the winter the team is active in cyclo-cross. Former team member Michael Goolaerts died following a cardiac arrest at the 2018 Paris–Roubaix in France.

2018 Team roster

Major wins

2014
Overall Flèche du Sud, Gaëtan Bille
Stage 2, Gaëtan Bille
Prologue Sibiu Cycling Tour, Olivier Pardini
Grand Prix de la ville de Pérenchies, Gaëtan Bille

2015
Overall Tour de Normandie, Dimitri Claeys
Stage 2, Dimitri Claeys
Stage 4 Tour of Croatia, Dimitri Claeys
Stage 1 Flèche du Sud, Gaëtan Bille
Overall Paris–Arras Tour, Joeri Calleeuw
Stage 1, Team time trial
Circuit de Wallonie, Stef Van Zummeren
Internationale Wielertrofee Jong Maar Moedig, Dimitri Claeys
Grand Prix de la ville de Pérenchies, Dimitri Claeys
Prologue Volta a Portugal, Gaëtan Bille
Giro del Friuli-Venezia Giulia, Gaëtan Bille
Overall Ronde van Midden-Nederland, Olivier Pardini
Stage 1, Team time trial

2016
Stage 2 Driedaagse van West-Vlaanderen, Timothy Dupont
Dorpenomloop Rucphen, Aidis Kruopis
Nokere Koerse, Timothy Dupont
Stages 1, 3 & 6 Tour de Normandie, Timothy Dupont
Dwars door de Vlaamse Ardennen, Timothy Dupont
Ronde van Overijssel, Aidis Kruopis
Grand Prix Criquielion, Timothy Dupont
Overall Paris–Arras Tour, Aidis Kruopis
Stages 1 & 2, Aidis Kruopis
Memorial Van Coningsloo, Timothy Dupont
Stage 2 Ronde de l'Oise, Dries De Bondt

2017
Ronde van Limburg, Wout van Aert
Bruges Cycling Classic, Wout van Aert
Grand Prix Pino Cerami, Wout van Aert
Rad am Ring, Huub Duyn

2018
Stage 4 Étoile de Bessèges, Sean De Bie
Overall Danmark Rundt, Wout van Aert
Stage 2, Wout van Aert
Stages 3 & 5, Tim Merlier

References

UCI Professional Continental teams
UCI Continental Teams (Europe)
Cycling teams based in Belgium
Cycling teams established in 2013